Lochloosa is the second studio album by the Jacksonville, Florida-based band MOFRO. The album was inspired by Lochloosa Lake, which embodies the natural part of the Florida heartland that the band often sings about in their songs.

Track listing
"Y'all Ready"
"That Boy"
"Lochloosa"
"Dirtfloorcracker"
"Fireflies"
"Ten Thousand Islands"
"Six Ways From Sunday"
"The Wrong Side"
"Everybody's"
"Gal Youngin"
"How Junior Got His Head Put Out"
"The Long Way Home"
"Pray For Rain"

Personnel
 JJ Grey - vocals, acoustic guitar (2, 3, 5, 13), electric guitar (4, 7), harmonica (3, 5, 6, 9, 10, 11, 12, 13), bass (2, 8, 9), tambourine (7, 10, 12), electric piano (8, 9), acoustic piano (9)
 Daryl Hance - slide guitar (1, 3, 4, 5, 6, 7, 9, 10, 11, 12)
 Fabrice Quentin - bass (1, 3, 4, 5, 6, 7, 10, 11, 12), shaker (11)
 Craig Barnette - drums (3, 4, 5, 6, 7, 10, 11, 12), percussion (11)
 George Sluppick - drums (2, 8, 9), tambourine (2, 8, 9), backing vocals (2, 7, 8, 9, 12)
 Mike Shapiro - electric piano (1, 3, 4, 5, 7), acoustic piano (6, 10, 11, 12), organ (6)
 Malcolm "Papa Mali" Melbourne - acoustic and slide guitar, backing vocals (2, 8, 9)
 Robert Walter - organ (3)
 Todd Sickafoose - acoustic upright bass (10)
 Dan Prothero - producer, engineer, editing, mixing, graphic design, photography, programming

References

External links
 MOFRO: Lochloosa
 Fog City Records presents: MOFRO
 JJ Grey & Mofro website
 JJ Grey& Mofro Fan Site

2004 albums
JJ Grey & Mofro albums